Talakaya kura is a popular meat dish in Telangana and Andhra Pradesh. In Telugu Talakaya means head of goat or lamb. It is also called talakaya pulusu when Tamarind is added.

Talakaya means "head" and kura means "curry". This dish involves cooking the head or a goat or sheep. It is the most frequently served item at many functions and festivals in Telangana. It is very good for joint and back pain, very good medicine for bones.

References

Telangana cuisine
Indian meat dishes